Pathfinder may refer to:

Businesses
 Pathfinder Energy Services, a division of Smith International
 Pathfinder Press, a publisher of socialist literature

Computing and information science
 Path Finder, a Macintosh file browser
 Pathfinder (website)
 Pathfinder networks, a psychometric scaling method
 Java Pathfinder, a software testing tool
 Pathfinder (library science), a subject bibliography often offered on library websites
 Pathfinder Technologies, retail technology leader

Entertainment

Novels
 The Pathfinder, or The Inland Sea, an 1840 novel by James Fenimore Cooper
 Pathfinders (novel), a 1944 novel by Cecil Lewis
 Pathfinder (novel), a 2010 novel by Orson Scott Card
 TodHunter Moon, Book One: PathFinder, a 2014 novel by Angie Sage

Film and television
 The Pathfinder (1952 film), based on the book by James Fenimore Cooper
 Pathfinder (1987 film), a Norwegian Oscar-nominated film
 The Pathfinder (1996 film), a TV movie based on the book by James Fenimore Cooper
 Pathfinder (2007 film), an action film based on the 1987 film
 Pathfinders (TV series), a 1972-1973 British television series
 "Pathfinder" (Star Trek: Voyager), a television series episode

Music
 Pathfinder (band), a Polish symphonic power metal band
 Pathfinder (album), a 1972 Beggars Opera album
 Path.Finder, a 2019 Notaker EP

Card, dice and board games
 Pathfinder Roleplaying Game
 Pathfinder (periodicals), a series of supplements to the game
 Pathfinder: Kingmaker, a computer game based in this fictional universe
 Pathfinder: Wrath of the Righteous, a computer game sequel to Kingmaker
 Pathfinder, a 1977 Milton Bradley Company board game
 "Pathfinder", a The Price Is Right pricing game

Fictional characters
 Pathfinder, a G.I. Joe: A Real American Hero character
 Path Finder (Transformers), an animated television series character
 Pathfinder, a character in the battle royale game Apex Legends

Military
 Pathfinder (military), a type of soldier
 Pathfinder (RAF), English target-marking squadrons during World War II
 Pathfinder (USAAF), American radar-equipped bombers during World War II
 Pathfinders Company (Portugal), a Portuguese military unit
 Pathfinder Platoon, a British military unit
 HMS Pathfinder, several Royal Navy ships
 Pathfinder-class cruiser, a two-ship Royal Navy class
 USS Pathfinder, the name of several U.S. Navy ships
 Pathfinder-class survey ship, a class of U.S. Navy ship
 Piasecki 16H Pathfinder, an experimental series of helicopters produced in the 1960s for the US Army
 Pathfinder, a nickname of the 8th Infantry Division (United States)
 Pathfinder Badge, Pathfinder Platoon
 Pathfinder, a revolver manufactured by Charter Arms

People
 Matthew Fontaine Maury (1806–1873), Navy captain and oceanographer nicknamed "Pathfinder of the Seas"
 John C. Frémont (1813–1890), military officer and explorer, nicknamed "The Pathfinder"

Places
 Pathfinder National Wildlife Refuge, Wyoming
 Pathfinder Dam, on the North Platte River, Wyoming
 Pathfinder Reservoir, Wyoming
 Camp Pathfinder, a boys' camp in Ontario

Transportation

Road vehicles
 Pathfinder (1912 automobile)
 LUTZ Pathfinder, the UK's first autonomous car, shown to the public in 2015
 Nissan Pathfinder, a sport utility vehicle introduced in 1986
 Pontiac Pathfinder, an American automobile produced from 1953 to 1958
 Riley Pathfinder, a British automobile produced from 1953 to 1957
 Wright Pathfinder, a bus body

Aircraft
 Keystone Pathfinder, a 1920s airliner, built only as a prototype
 NASA Pathfinder, high altitude, solar-powered unmanned aircraft
 Pathfinder, the marketing name of the Piper PA-28 Cherokee, a light, piston-powered aircraft from 1974 to 1977
 Soloy Pathfinder 21, a twin-engined, single propeller turboprop aircraft
 Space Shuttle Pathfinder, a Space Shuttle test simulator made of steel and wood

Ships
 S.T.V. Pathfinder, a Canadian sail-training vessel

Youth organizations
 Pathfinders (Girl Guides), a division of the Girl Guides of Canada
 Pathfinders (Seventh-day Adventist), a youth organization

Other uses
 Pathfinder Camera, an instant camera made by Polaroid
 Pathfinder International, an American reproductive health organization
 Pathfinder March, a  walk connecting all the RAF Pathfinder air stations from the Second World War
 Pathfinder Nuclear Generating Station
 Pathfinder Parkway, an Oklahoma walking, jogging and biking trail
 Charter Arms Pathfinder, a revolver
 Mars Pathfinder, a NASA Mars Lander
 Milton Keynes Pathfinders, an American football team based in Milton Keynes, England
 Adenocaulon bicolor, a flowering plant in the daisy family known as Pathfinder
 Housing Market Renewal Initiative, a UK programme, also referred to as Pathfinder
 Ulmus parvifolia 'Pathfinder', a Chinese Elm cultivar

See also
 Pathfinding, as in algorithms for finding a route
 Sakigake (translated into English as "Pathfinder" or "Pioneer"), Japan's first interplanetary spacecraft
 Sperrbrecher (German for "pathfinder"), a category of auxiliary warships used by the German Kriegsmarine during World War II
 Wolf pack Pfadfinder (German for "pathfinder"), a German World War II wolf pack in the Battle of the Atlantic
 An isogram, of which "pathfinder" is an example that can be used as a numerical cipher